Scouterna - the Guides and Scouts of Sweden (Swedish for the Scouts) is the national Scouting and Guiding organisation of Sweden. The organisation was formed in 2012 by a restructuring of the Svenska Scoutförbundet and accepted as the successor of the Svenska Scoutrådet by the World Association of Girl Guides and Girl Scouts and the World Organization of the Scout Movement in 2013. The co-educational organisation has about 70,000 members.

History 

The first Swedish organisations for Boy Scouts were founded in 1911 and 1912 and for Girl Guides in 1913. The movement developed mainly in two distinct branches: Non-religious units were organised in Sveriges Scoutförbundet (for boys) and Sveriges Flickors Scoutförbund (for girls) and Protestant units formed the KFUM:s Scoutförbund (YMCA Scouts for boys) and the Sveriges KFUK:s Scoutförbund (YWCA Guides for girls). Scouting and Guiding existed also within temperance organisations like the IOGT and the NTO.

In 1930, the Sveriges Scoutförbund and the KFUM:s Scoutförbund founded the Svenska Scoutunionen (Swedish Scout Union) as an umbrella organisation aiming at the external representation of Swedish Scouting and at the harmonisation of the Scout programme. The Girl Guides followed in 1931 with the foundation of Sveriges Flickscoutråd (Girl Guide Council of Sweden).

In the 1960s, Swedish Scouting and Guiding became co-educational. Sveriges Scoutförbundet and Sveriges Flickors Scoutförbund merged into Svenska Scoutförbundet in 1960, and KFUM:s Scoutförbund and Sveriges KFUK:s Scoutförbund formed the KFUK-KFUMs Scoutförbund in 1966. In 1968, this was followed by the merger of both national bodies into the Svenska Scoutrådet.

Started by a grassroots' movement within the then five member associations of the Svenska Scoutrådet, the unification of the Swedish Scout and Guide movement was discussed since the mid-1990s. Important steps towards this goal were the national jamborees in 2001 and 2007 as well as the introduction of a common Scout uniform in 2007. In 2010 and 2011, the general meetings of all five associations voted for the unification. The Svenska Scoutförbundet was renamed to Scouterna in 2012. The Frälsningsarméns Scoutförbund and the KFUK-KFUMs Scoutförbund were fully integrated into Scouterna, and Nykterhetsrörelsens Scoutförbund and SMU Scout partly.

Structure 
The current structure of Scouterna takes into account that Scouting and Guiding in Sweden developed in several distinct organisations, most of them sponsored by religious institutions. It tries to unify all organisations into a single movement while maintaining the ties between the local units and their sponsoring bodies. All local units are equally represented in "Scouternas stämma", the general meeting of Scouterna, but their integration into Scouterna's structures and the ways and means of organisational support differ.

About two thirds of the 1,100 local units are directly served by the national office of Scouterna and organised in its regional districts, among them the units of the former Svenska Scoutförbundet as well as all units of the Frälsningsarméns Scoutförbund and the KFUK-KFUMs Scoutförbund; the latter two still existing organisations are fully integrated in Scouterna's structures and don't conduct own activities any longer.

Three so-called "samverkansorganisationer" (co-operating organisations) make up the remainder of the members; the Nykterhetsrörelsens Scoutförbund, equmeniascout (formerly SMU Scout) and SALT Scout (the Scouting organisation of the Swedish Evangelical Mission) keep up their own structures while following the national programme of Scouterna.

Programme

Age groups 
Scouterna is divided in five age groups. Most local units cater for all age groups; some districts organise the Rover Scouts in separate regional units.
 Spårarscout (Tracker Scout) — ages 8 to 10
 Upptäckarscout (Discoverer Scout) — ages 10 to 12
 Äventyrsscout (Adventurer Scout) — ages 12 to 15 
 Utmanarscout (Challenger Scout) — ages 15 to 18
 Roverscout (Rover Scout) — ages 19 to 25

Ideals 
All age groups use the same Scout promise:
Jag lovar att efter bästa förmåga följa scoutlagen. — I promise to do my best in following the Scout Law.
The Scout law was formulated in 1970 for all member organisations of the then Svenska Scoutrådet:
En scout söker sin tro och respekterar andras. — A Scout seeks her/his faith and respects the faith of others.
En scout är ärlig och pålitlig. — A Scout is honest and reliable.
En scout är vänlig och hjälpsam. — A Scout is friendly and helpful.
En scout visar hänsyn och är en god kamrat. — A Scout is considerate to others and trustworthy as a friend.
En scout möter svårigheter med gott humör. — A Scout faces difficulties without complaining.
En scout lär känna och vårdar naturen. — A Scout learns about nature and is concerned with its conservation.
En scout känner ansvar för sig själv och andra. — A Scout feels responsibility for her/himself and others.
The Scout motto is Var redo! - Alltid redo! — Be Prepared! - Always Prepared!

Sea Scouts 

Sea Scouting is available to all age groups within Scouterna. About 70 local units with 7,000 members are active in Sea Scouting, mostly along the coastline, especially in the Stockholm archipelago. They are organised in Sveriges sjöscouters riksskeppslag, the national council of Swedish Sea Scouts, a special interest group which coordinates the activities of the Sea Scout units.

Awards 
Adult members can be awarded medals based on years of service. "Scouternas Stora Förtjänstmärke" can be awarded to active leaders for particularly meritorious efforts for the local level. "Ledfyren" can be awarded an active Scout leader under the age of 25 years who created opportunities for young people to develop according to Scouting values. The "Gustaf Adolfs-märket" can be awarded to active leaders for particular meritorious service at least on district level. The highest award in Swedish Scouting is the "Silvervargen" (the Silver Wolf) that can be awarded for extraordinary contributions to Scouting on at least national level.

Facilities 
The national headquarters is located in Sweden's capital Stockholm. The organisation runs its own Scout shop and the building also hosts a scouting museum, displaying objects from the history of Swedish scouting.

Scouterna and its local structures run a large number of Scout camps and huts. Internationally known is the island of Vässarö, owned by the Stockholm Scout district. The Campground at Ransbergs Herrgård near Ransäter in Värmland County was acquired by Nykterhetsrörelsens Scoutförbund in 1963; it was the venue of the World Scout Moot in 1996. Kopparbo Scout camp near Söderbärke in Dalarna County can accommodate up to 5,000 Scouts, Hörrs Nygård Scout camp near Sjöbo in Skåne County up to 3,000 and Kragenäs Scout camp near Tanumshede in Västra Götaland County up to 1,000. 

Frustunaby is national scout facility owned by Scouterna, given as a gift to the Guides of Sweden in 1925.

The national sailing vessel of Scouterna, Biscaya av Vindalsö, was scheduled to be sold in 2016.

References

External links
 Scouterna official website 
 Scouterna in English

World Association of Girl Guides and Girl Scouts member organizations
World Organization of the Scout Movement member organizations
Scouting and Guiding in Sweden
Organizations established in 2012
2012 establishments in Sweden